Saint Cyra (also Chera, Crea, and Cere filia Duibhrea) was an early Irish abbess.  Her feast day is 16 October.

The virgin saint was abbess of the monastery of Killchere ("Cyra's Church") in that part of Munster which was called Muscragia or Muskerry. The site is now occupied by the ruins of a later Franciscan Kilcrea Friary.

References
 Richard Challoner.  Britannia Sancta:  or, The Lives of the most Celebrated British, English, Scottish, and Irish Saints. Part II.  London:  Thomas Meighan, 1745.

Christian saints in unknown century
Medieval Irish saints
Female saints of medieval Ireland
Medieval Gaels from Ireland
Women of medieval Ireland
Year of birth unknown